Resistant cancer or refractory cancer is the cancer that does not respond to medical treatment. It may be resistant at the beginning of treatment, or it may become resistant during treatment.

See also 

 Antineoplastic resistance
 Drug resistance

References

Types of cancer